Tracy Denean Sharpley-Whiting is a feminist scholar and Gertrude Conaway Vanderbilt Distinguished Professor of French in the Department of French and Italian at Vanderbilt University where she serves as Vice Provost of Arts and Libraries as well as Director of the Callie House Research Center for the Study of Global Black Cultures and Politics. She served as Associate Provost for Academic Advancement from October 2021-June 2022. She was also the Chair of African American and Diaspora Studies until August 2022. She is editor of The Speech: Race and Barack Obama's "A More Perfect Union", and editor of the academic journal Palimpsest: A Journal on Women, Gender, and the Black International. She is also series co-editor of "Philosophy and Race" (SUNY Press) with philosopher Robert Bernasconi.

Biography
Sharpley-Whiting received the PhD in French Studies from Brown in 1994.

She served as Director of the William T. Bandy Center for Baudelaire and Modern French Studies from 2006-2012.

In September 2007, Sharpley-Whiting testified before Congress at the hearing, From Imus to Industry: The Business of Stereotypes and Degrading Images. She served on the Executive Council of the Modern Language Association from 2014-2018. She also served as chair/president of the Executive Advisory Committee for the Association of Departments of Foreign Languages and Literatures. Sharpley-Whiting is a former Camargo Foundation Fellow (Cassis, France); a George and Eliza Howard Foundation Fellow; and a Rockefeller Foundation Fellow at the Bellagio Study Center (Bellagio, Italy).

Awards and honors
In 2020, Sharpley-Whiting won the SEC (SouthEastern Conference) Faculty Achievement Award for Vanderbilt University for her research and teaching. Sharpley-Whiting was named one of the top 100 young leaders of the African American community by The Root, an online magazine founded by scholar Henry Louis Gates Jr. She received the 2006 Horace Mann Medal from Brown University. The award is given annually by the Brown Graduate School to an alumnus or alumna who has made significant contributions in his or her field, inside or outside of academia. Her book, Pimps Up, Ho's Down: Hip Hop's Hold on Young Black Women, received the Emily Toth Award for the Best Single Work by One or More Authors in Women's Issues in Popular and American Culture in a specific year from the Popular Culture Association/American Culture Association. Her book, Bricktop's Paris: African American Women in Jazz-Age Paris and The Autobiography of Ada Bricktop Smith, or Miss Baker Regrets was a 2015 Choice Outstanding Academic Title and The American Library in Paris 2015 Book Award Long List Nominee.

Selected works

Single authored books 

 
 
 
 
Sharpley-Whiting, Tracy Denean (2015). Bricktop's Paris: African American women in jazz-age Paris. Albany: State University of New York Press. .

Edited and co-edited books 
 Sharpley-Whiting, Tracy Denean; Gilles Boëtsch; Nicolas Bancel; Pascal Blanchard; Sylvie Chalaye; Fanny Robles; Jean-François Staszak; Christelle Taraud; Dominic Thomas; Naïma Yahi (2019). Sexualités, identité & corps colonisés: XVe siècle – XXIe siècle. Paris: Groupe de Recherche ACHAC. .
Sharpley-Whiting, Tracy Denean avec collaboration de Roger Little (2018). La Vénus hottentote: écrits, 1810 à 1814, suivi des textes inédits. Paris: Editions L'Harmattan. .

References

Living people
Fanon scholars
American feminist writers
American women writers
African-American feminists
American social scientists
African-American social scientists
American women academics
Vanderbilt University faculty
Miami University alumni
University of Rochester alumni
Brown University alumni
Year of birth missing (living people)